Vexillum terraqueum is a species of sea snail, a marine gastropod mollusk, in the family Costellariidae, the ribbed miters.

Distribution
This species occurs in the following locations:
 Honshu Island
 Okinawa

References

terraqueum
Gastropods described in 2017